Neustupov is a market town in Benešov District in the Central Bohemian Region of the Czech Republic. It has about 500 inhabitants.

Administrative parts
Villages and hamlets of Barčov, Bořetice, Broumovice, Chlístov, Dolní Borek, Hojšín, Jiřetice, Královna, Podlesí, Sedlečko, Slavín, Vlčkovice, Vrchy, Záhoříčko, Zálesí and Žinice are administrative parts of Neustupov.

Geography
It lies in the Vlašim Uplands. The Slupský Stream springs here, flows across the territory and supplies a system of ponds.

History
The first written mention of Neustupov is from 1186. The village was promoted to a market town by Emperor Leopold I in 1666.

Sights
The Church of the Assumption of the Virgin Mary was originally a Romanesque church, probably from the first half of the 12th century. It was rebuilt several times, but its Romanesque tower has been preserved. Next to the church is a rectory built in 1829–1834.

The second landmark is the Neustupov Castle. It was built in the 17th century, on the site of an old fortress from the 12th or 13th century. It was rebuilt and extended many times and today it has the neo-Gothic form. It is privately owned and inaccessible to the public.

Notable people
Julie Fantová-Kusá (1858–1908), suffragette and feminist

References

External links

Populated places in Benešov District
Market towns in the Czech Republic